More Beautiful Human Life! is the fifth album by composer Paul Schütze, released in 1994 through Apollo Records. It was released under the pseudonym Uzect Plaush, which is actually an anagram of Paul Schutze.

Track listing

Personnel 
Denis Blackham – mastering
Andrew Hulme – engineering
Jane Joyce – design
Adam Routh – engineering
Paul Schütze – instruments, production

References

External links 
 

1994 albums
Paul Schütze albums
Albums produced by Paul Schütze